Kriterion: Journal of Philosophy is a peer-reviewed academic journal of philosophy that was established in 1991. The journal is dedicated to analytic philosophy and publishes articles in English and German. It is a sponsor of the annual Salzburg Conference for Young Analytic Philosophy (SOPhiA) since its inception in 2010.

The journal is listed as a key journal in The Philosopher's Index and included in the European Reference Index for the Humanities. It is abstracted and indexed in EBSCO databases and Scopus.

References

External links
 

Analytic philosophy literature
Philosophy journals
Contemporary philosophical literature
Multilingual journals
Publications established in 1991
Triannual journals